Oleksiy Kasyanov or Oleksii Serhiiovych Kasianov (born 26 August 1985 in Stakhanov (now Kadiivka, Ukraine) is a Ukrainian decathlete.

Career
His personal best score is 8479 points, achieved at the 2009 World Championships in Berlin, Germany. He won the 2010 TNT-Fortuna Meeting in Kladno with a total of 8381 points, leading from the first day onwards with the help of a 14.24 seconds personal best in the 110 metres hurdles.

Personal life
Since 2014, he is married to Ukrainian heptathlete Hanna Melnychenko.

Competition record

References

1985 births
Living people
Ukrainian decathletes
Athletes (track and field) at the 2008 Summer Olympics
Athletes (track and field) at the 2012 Summer Olympics
Athletes (track and field) at the 2016 Summer Olympics
Olympic athletes of Ukraine
People from Stakhanov, Ukraine
European Athletics Championships medalists
World Athletics Championships athletes for Ukraine
Sportspeople from Luhansk Oblast